Case of Schlitte is a trial against Hans Schlitte which was held in 1548 in Lübeck. Ivan the Terrible asked Hans Schlitte to bring with him to Moscovia a lot of masters and doctors.

Schlitke managed to hire around 300 men.

First people tried to come to Moscovia through Livonia, but were kept in Wenden (now Cēsis, Latvia). The rest of hired men tried to reach Moscovia by sea, but also failed to do it.

Literature 
 К делу Ганса Шлитте // Копенгагенские акты, относящиеся к русской истории. Первый выпуск 1326—1569 гг. / Пер. Ю. Н. Щербачёва // Чтения в обществе истории и древностей Российских при Московском университете. — № 4. — Moscow, 1915.
 Bernhard Diestelkamp, Eine versuchte Annäherung Zar Iwans IV., des Schrecklichen, an den Westen? Ein Reichskammergerichtsprozess, der dies Nahelegt. In: Reich, Regionen und Europa in Mittelalter und Neuzeit. Festschrift für Peter Moraw. Berlin 2000, lk 305–322.
 P. Pierling S. I., Papes et tsars (1547-1597) d'après des documents nouveaux, Parigi Retaux-Bray, 1890, citato in La Civiltà Cattolica, serie XIV, volume V, fascicolo 959, 1890, pag. 714-715. Google Books

1548
History of Lübeck
Livonian War